David Castedo Escudero (born 26 January 1974), sometimes known as just David, is a Spanish former professional footballer who played as a left back. He was known for his tenacity.

He appeared in 255 La Liga games over ten seasons, mostly for Sevilla which he helped win four major titles, including two UEFA Cups.

Club career
A product of RCD Mallorca's youth academy, Castedo was born in Palma, Majorca, and first played with the first team while they were in the second division. In the 1996–97 season, he appeared in 33 league matches as the local powerhouse returned to La Liga.

After two loan spells, first with Hércules CF then with CF Extremadura (the latter in the top level), David returned to the Balearic Islands, featuring in only eight matches in his second spell but also scoring his first goal as a professional. Subsequently, he moved to Sevilla FC, where he experienced the most successful and steady years of his career: after playing 39 games to help the Andalusians to a 2001 top flight promotion, he went on to become one of the team's most important players, also being named, after Javi Navarro and José Luis Martí, team captain.

In the 2005–06 campaign, Castedo appeared in 33 league contests, also playing in all of the season's UEFA Cup matches as Sevilla lifted the trophy against Middlesbrough – 11 of those were complete. In the following year, due to the emergence of youth graduate Antonio Puerta and the consolidation of Ivica Dragutinović, he appeared less, but still managed 26 appearances overall, including seven in the UEFA Cup as the club renewed its European title.

After seven years at the Ramón Sánchez Pizjuán Stadium, David moved in August 2007 to Levante UD, which was relegated from the top division at the end of the season. He retired aged 34, after having played 426 games as a professional.

Honours
Sevilla
Copa del Rey: 2006–07
UEFA Cup: 2005–06, 2006–07
UEFA Super Cup: 2006
Segunda División: 2000–01

References

External links

1974 births
Living people
Footballers from Palma de Mallorca
Spanish footballers
Association football defenders
La Liga players
Segunda División players
RCD Mallorca players
Hércules CF players
CF Extremadura footballers
Sevilla FC players
UEFA Cup winning players
Levante UD footballers